Most states do  not mandate certain standard gasoline grade octane ratings.  In the United States and Canada, octane ratings are in AKI, commonly shown as "(R+M)/2". All states require gas pumps to be labeled with the correct octane level and nearly all states do regular testing to make sure gas stations are in compliance. A minimum 82 octane fuel is recommended for most vehicles produced since 1984. Older cars with carburetors could operate with lower octane fuel at higher elevations. Regardless of legality fuel with an octane rating of less than 82 is generally not offered for sale in most states. However 85 and 86 octane gasoline can still commonly be found in several rocky mountain states but availability is declining  due to fewer cars with carburetors being still on the road and they are already gone  in  many states that previously sold it like Alaska, Maine and North Dakota.

State Octane Ratings 
The octane ratings below are the lowest allowed by law and may or may not reflect the actual levels offered for sale at most gas stations. Ethanol's effect on octane is not considered—these are ratings that are seen at the pump.

References

Petroleum in the United States
Standards of the United States
Octane ratings